This is a list of diplomatic missions in Nauru. As the Nauruan government does not maintain a website devoted to external affairs, the information on this page has been gathered from the websites of the concerned foreign ministries. The de facto capital, Yaren, hosts no embassy.

Embassies/High Commissions

Aiwo
 (Representative)

Yaren

Non-Resident Embassies/High Commissions

See also
Foreign relations of Nauru
List of diplomatic missions of Nauru

References

Diplomatic misssions
Nauru
Diplomatic missions